Lar railway station is a railway station in  Pakistan.

References

See also
 List of railway stations in Pakistan
 Pakistan Railways

Railway stations in Multan District